Manjali is a small town in Ernakulam district, Kerala, India.

Gallery

Cities and towns in Ernakulam district